Roti Bunz is an Indonesian bakery, bistro, and coffeehouse chain based in Malang, East Java, Indonesia. The company was founded in 2012 by Yudi Haryanto.

History 
In 2012, Roti Bunz was established as Roti Bunz Bakery & Cafe. In 2014, its outlets have implemented franchise system until now. At the end of 2015, this outlet was renamed Roti Bunz Bistro.

Products 
The menu concept promoted by Roti Bunz is a menu concept that serves bakery, coffees and mainstream bistro foods. The main menu that is relied on is bread bun which has filling and given toppings. The cafe menu is represented by coffee, tea and chocolate. Other foods and beverages menu such as noodles, rice bowls, and milkshakes are also on Roti Bunz.

Awards 
List of awards received by Roti Bunz:

 Top Quality Product Excellent Award Winner TOP 50 Leader
 Indonesia Top Business Innovation Award
 Anugerah Wirausaha Indonesia

See also 

 List of coffeehouse chains

References

External links 
 Roti Bunz official website

Food and drink companies of Indonesia
Restaurants established in 2012
Indonesian brands
2012 establishments in Indonesia
Companies based in Malang
Malang